Charles Edward Borah (November 11, 1905 – April 11, 1980) was an American athlete, winner of gold medal in 4 × 100 m relay at the 1928 Summer Olympics.

A Phillips Academy, Andover graduate, Borah won the AAU championships in 100 yd in 1926, in 220 yd in 1927 and in 200 m in 1928. As a University of Southern California student, Borah won the IC4A championships in both 100 yd and 220 yd in 1927. He also equalled the Charley Paddock's world record in 100 yd of 9.6 in two occasions, in 1926 and in 1927. At the Amsterdam Olympics, Borah reached to the quarterfinals in 100 m and ran the third leg in the American 4 × 100 m relay team, which equalled the world record of 41.0 in the final. He died in Phoenix, Arizona in 1980.

References

External links
 

1905 births
1980 deaths
American male sprinters
Athletes (track and field) at the 1928 Summer Olympics
Olympic gold medalists for the United States in track and field
University of Southern California alumni
Medalists at the 1928 Summer Olympics
USA Outdoor Track and Field Championships winners